Baby It's You is a studio album by the Shirelles, released in 1962. It contains the hits "Baby It's You" and "Soldier Boy".

Reception
In his retrospective review of the release, Richie Unterberger for AllMusic wrote that "it's a pretty solid effort for its day, featuring state-of-the-art orchestral early-'60s New York girl group production and decent songwriting."

Track listing

Side 1
"Baby It's You" (Burt Bacharach, Mack David, Barney Williams) – 2:43
"Irresistible You" (Luther Dixon, Al Kasha) – 2:14
"The Things I Want to Hear (Pretty Words)" (Fred Anisfield, Willie Denson) – 2:42
"Big John (Ain't You Gonna Marry Me)" (Big John Patton, Amiel Summers, Titus Turner) – 2:20
"The Same Old Story" (Luther Dixon) – 2:21
"Voice of Experience" (Big John Patton) – 2:20

Side 2
"Soldier Boy" (Luther Dixon, Florence Green) – 2:42
"A Thing of the Past" (Bob Brass, Irwin Levine) – 2:39
"Twenty-One" (Luther Dixon) – 2:02
"Make the Night a Little Longer" (Gerry Goffin, Carole King) – 2:32
"Twisting in the U.S.A." (Kal Mann) – 1:54
"Putty (In Your Hands)" (Big John Patton) – 2:29

Personnel
Doris Coley – lead and backing vocals
Addie "Micki" Harris – lead and backing vocals
Beverly Lee – lead and backing vocals
Shirley Owens – lead and backing vocals

References

1962 albums
The Shirelles albums
Sundazed Records albums
Albums produced by Luther Dixon
Albums produced by Bob Irwin